WNIK (1230 AM, "Unica Radio") is a radio station licensed to serve Arecibo, Puerto Rico.  The station is owned by Unik Broadcasting System Corporation. It airs a News/Talk format.

The station was assigned the WNIK call letters by the Federal Communications Commission.

References

External links
WNIK official website

News and talk radio stations in Puerto Rico
Radio stations established in 1959
1959 establishments in Puerto Rico
NIK (AM)